USS Polaris, originally called the America, was an 1864-screw steamer procured by the Union Navy as USS Periwinkle during the final months of the American Civil War. She served the Union Navy's struggle against the Confederate States as a gunboat.

After the war, the ship was retained by the U.S. Navy. She was renamed Polaris in 1871 and became the designated vessel of the Hall scientific expedition to the North Pole. It was on this voyage that she proceeded into Arctic waters, only to have her hull crushed by the ice in October 1872.

Construction 
America, a heavy screw tugboat built at Philadelphia, in 1864, was purchased by the Union Navy December 9, 1864, from John W. Lynn; renamed Periwinkle; and commissioned early in January 1865, acting Master Henry C. Macy in command.

Potomac Flotilla 
The two-masted, schooner-rigged, white oak tug joined the Potomac Flotilla on January 15, 1865, as a gunboat, operating primarily in the Rappahannock River.

The Flotilla also interrupted contraband business between lower Maryland and Virginia, and cleared the rivers of mines, and fought guerillas ashore.

After the Civil War ended, Periwinkle continued to serve with the flotilla until June 1865. Next, ordered to Norfolk, Virginia, she operated out of the Norfolk Navy Yard until placed in ordinary during 1867.

Furthest North 
In late 1870, she was selected for service with the Hall scientific expedition, led by Charles Francis Hall, and was sent to the Washington Navy Yard for refitting. Renamed USS Polaris in early-1871, she arrived at the New York Navy Yard on June 9 to complete loading of stores and provisions for the expedition. She set sail in July 1871.

Aiming for the North Pole, she reached 82° 29′N latitude, then the furthest point north reached by a vessel. Polaris was caught in the ice on the homeward voyage in October 1872, and carried for some distance before being crushed. Her crew was subsequently rescued, including a party of 18 people led by William F. C. Nindemann, who had debarked to land provisions after the hull of the Polaris had begun to leak, only to have the section of the ice floe they were on break away from the section holding the Polaris.

The lost party floated for 196 days and were subsequently rescued separately from the vessel.

References

External links 

 

1864 ships
1871 ships
American Civil War patrol vessels of the United States
Arctic exploration vessels
Gunboats of the United States Navy
Maritime incidents in October 1872
Polaris expedition
Research vessels of the United States Navy
Ships built in Philadelphia
Ships of the Union Navy
Shipwrecks of the Canadian Arctic coast
Steamships of the United States Navy